Milena Canonero, Dame Grand Cross (born 13 July 1949) is an Italian costume designer, who has worked for both film and stage productions. She has won four Academy Awards for Best Costume Design, and been nominated for the award a total of nine times. She is married to actor Marshall Bell.

Career
Born in Turin, Italy, Canonero studied art, design history and costume design in Genoa. She then moved to England, where she began working in small theatre and film productions. While designing for commercials in London, she met many film directors

Her first major film work as a costume designer was in Stanley Kubrick's A Clockwork Orange (1971), having met Kubrick on the set of 2001: A Space Odyssey (1968). She worked with Kubrick again on Barry Lyndon (1975), for which she won her first Oscar with Ulla-Britt Söderlund, and The Shining (1980). Her second Oscar win was for Chariots of Fire (1981), directed by Hugh Hudson.

Canonero has also designed the costumes for several stagings directed by Otto Schenk, such as Il trittico (Vienna State Opera 1979), As You Like It (Salzburg Festival 1980), Die Fledermaus (Vienna State Opera 1980), Andrea Chénier (Vienna State Opera 1981), and Arabella (Metropolitan Opera 1983). For director Luc Bondy she created the costumes for new productions of Tosca (Metropolitan Opera, 2009), and of Helena (Burgtheater, Vienna, 2010).

In 1986, Canonero became the costume designer for the television series Miami Vice.

In 2001, Canonero received the Career Achievement Award in Film from the Costume Designers Guild. In 2005, Canonero won the guild's award for excellence in contemporary film for her work on Wes Anderson's The Life Aquatic with Steve Zissou (2004). She won her third Oscar for Sofia Coppola's Marie Antoinette (2006).

Canonero reteamed with Anderson in 2014 on The Grand Budapest Hotel, for which she received her ninth nomination and fourth win at the 87th Academy Awards. She also won a BAFTA award for her work on the film.

Milena Canonero was awarded an Honorary Golden Bear during the 67th Berlin International Film Festival.

Film credits

Awards and nominations
Academy Awards

BAFTA Awards

References

Further reading 
 Fabienne Liptay (ed.), Milena Canonero. Film-Konzepte 40 (edition text + kritik, 2015).

External links
 

1946 births
Living people
Best Costume Design Academy Award winners
Best Costume Design BAFTA Award winners
Honorary Golden Bear recipients
Italian costume designers
Italian designers
Opera designers
Theatre people from Turin
Women costume designers
Film people from Turin